The Universidad de la Comunicación (University of Communication) is a private university founded on December 13, 1976, that teaches undergraduate courses related to communication and culture such as: Publicity, Communication and Management of Culture and Art, Social Communication, Visual Communication, Organizational Communication, Marketing and Film.

It has the validation of the Mexican Secretariat of Public Education and the recognition of the International Advertising Association.

Campus

The university is located in a building that dates from the 1920s designed by architect E. Prunes, who took inspiration from the Palace of Azahara, with Islamic characteristics that can be seen on windows and balconies and “starting with the reliefs on the columns and its ends”. Its architecture is also considered eclectic, since it includes styles such as art nouveau and from the renaissance.

History 
As a start the building was habitational, being a grand manor located on the then new Colonia Roma, but then its use became educational as it has held several institutions like the Hebrew College Mount Sinai, the Mexican Liceum and the College Walden Dos.

References

External links 
Official Website of Universidad de la Comunicación

Private universities and colleges in Mexico
Universities in Mexico City